Y12 or Y-12 may refer to:
 Harbin Y-12, a Chinese twin-engine turboprop utility aircraft
 Y-12 Project, the project during the Manhattan Project to produce enriched uranium by an electromagnetic process
 Y-12 National Security Complex, a US nuclear weapon facility